Stuffed squash, courgette, marrow, mahshi, or zucchini is a dish common in the region of the former Ottoman Empire from the Balkans to the Levant and Egypt, a kind of dolma. It consists of various kinds of squash or zucchini stuffed with rice and sometimes meat and cooked on the stovetop or in the oven. The meat version is served hot, as a main course. The meatless version is considered an "olive-oil dish" and is often eaten at room temperature or warm.

Preparation
The placenta and seeds of larger, shorter, cylindrical immature squashes are pulled off, and the further proceeding is similar as for punjene paprike or sarma. Often, punjene tikvice (stuffed squashes) and punjene paprike (stuffed peppers) are made together, as a mixed dish.

Name
The name in various languages generally means literally "stuffed squash": ; ; ; ; ; ;  ; ; kousa mahshi  / ALA-LC: kūsā maḥshī.

Variants

In the Levant, this dish is flavoured with mint and garlic. In Cyprus, the flowers of the marrow are also stuffed.

The cultivar is called 'Cousa' in Robinson and Decker-Walters (1997) p. 77: "Some summer squash cultivars, e.g. the vegetable marrows (Cucurbita pepo) are consumed when almost mature. In the Middle East, nearly mature fruits of 'Cousa' are stuffed with meat and other ingredients, then baked".

In Canada, stuffed squash is often prepared with tomato sauce or spaghetti sauce as well as with melted cheese on top.

See also
 List of squash and pumpkin dishes
 List of stuffed dishes
 Sheikh al-mahshi, zucchini stuffed with minced lamb meat and pine nuts in yogurt sauce

References

Arab cuisine
Jordanian cuisine
Lebanese cuisine
Levantine cuisine
Ottoman cuisine
Palestinian cuisine
Squash and pumpkin dishes
Stuffed vegetable dishes
Syrian cuisine
Balkan cuisine
Israeli cuisine